Mafra may refer to:

Places
Brazil
 Mafra, Santa Catarina, a municipality in the State of Santa Catarina
Portugal
 Mafra, Portugal, town and municipality in the district of Lisbon
 Mafra National Palace, a palace/monastery located in Mafra

Organisations
 Mafra (company), a Czech media group
 the Korean Ministry of Agriculture, Food and Rural Affairs (South Korea) (농림축산식품부)

See also
 Maffra, Victoria